Bratislav Punoševac (Serbian Cyrillic: Братислав Пуношевац; born 9 July 1987) is a Serbian professional footballer who plays as a forward for Trayal Kruševac.

In his home country, Punoševac played for Serbian SuperLiga clubs Napredak Kruševac, Radnički Niš and Borac Čačak. He also spent several years abroad in Romania, Japan, Hungary, Moldova and Kazakhstan, respectively.

Career
On 25 September 2019, Punoševac was released by FC Kaisar. 

On 22 January 2020 he joined Taraz.

Honours
Oțelul Galați
 Liga I: 2010–11
 Supercupa României: 2011

References

External links
 
 
 

Sportspeople from Kruševac
1987 births
Living people
Serbian footballers
Serbian expatriate footballers
ASA 2013 Târgu Mureș players
ASC Oțelul Galați players
Association football forwards
Avispa Fukuoka players
Békéscsaba 1912 Előre footballers
Budapest Honvéd FC players
FC Dacia Chișinău players
FC Kaisar players
FC Kyzylzhar players
FK Borac Čačak players
FK Napredak Kruševac players
FK Radnički Niš players
FC Taraz players
J2 League players
Kazakhstan Premier League players
Liga I players
Liga II players
Moldovan Super Liga players
Nemzeti Bajnokság I players
Serbian First League players
Serbian SuperLiga players
Expatriate footballers in Hungary
Expatriate footballers in Japan
Expatriate footballers in Kazakhstan
Expatriate footballers in Moldova
Expatriate footballers in Romania
Serbian expatriate sportspeople in Hungary
Serbian expatriate sportspeople in Japan
Serbian expatriate sportspeople in Kazakhstan
Serbian expatriate sportspeople in Moldova
Serbian expatriate sportspeople in Romania